The following is a list of unproduced John Carpenter projects in roughly chronological order. During a career that has spanned over 40 years, John Carpenter has worked on projects which never progressed beyond the pre-production stage under his direction. Some of the films were produced after he left production.

1970s

Meltdown
 In a 1998 interview with Carpenter, he said: "Well, here's the story. Back in 1977 I was a writer, and took an assignment called the "Prometheus Crisis" – about a nuclear plant meltdown. It's kind of Halloween in a nuclear power plant. It's been 20 years since they were trying to set it up – and at one point it was supposed to go with Dolph Lundgren. But I haven't heard anything about it. I don't have any attachment to it anymore, but we'll see what happens with it." After several attempts, the project was about to start filming in June 1994 under the helm of director John Dahl with Dolph Lundgren in the lead role, but the production was shutdown because of legal disputes regarding the US distribution rights claimed by several companies. Another attempt was announced in 1997 with actor Casper Van Dien but the ill-fated project still remains unproduced.

1980s

Firestarter
 In 1981, during filming of The Thing, Universal Pictures offered him the chance to direct Firestarter, based on the novel by Stephen King. Carpenter respectively hired Bill Lancaster and Bill Phillips to adapt the novel into different versions of the screenplay. Carpenter had intended Richard Dreyfuss as Andy McGee, and Lancaster's father Burt Lancaster as Captain John Hollister, but when The Thing was a financial disappointment, Universal replaced Carpenter with Mark L. Lester, and the script was written by Stanley Mann. In February 2022, it was revealed that Carpenter, his son Cody Carpenter, and Daniel Davies were set to compose the score for the 2022 remake.

The Philadelphia Experiment
 In 1982, Carpenter was working on the screenplay for the 1984 film The Philadelphia Experiment but struggled to complete the third act. In the end, his screenplay was completely rewritten by Wallace C. Bennett, with Carpenter's official credit on the film being an executive producer.

The Ninja
 Originally in the 1980s, the rights to make a film adaptation of The Ninja were bought by producers Richard D. Zanuck and David Brown for 20th Century Fox to produce. Irvin Kershner was hired to direct, using a screenplay written by W.D. Richter, which followed the novel very closely. Tom Cole was hired to write a draft, while Kershner himself also wrote a draft. Kershner turned out to be the wrong man for the job and was replaced by John Carpenter as new director. Carpenter co-wrote a second draft with Tommy Lee Wallace in 1983, but it turned out not filmable. A frustrating year after being hired, Carpenter left for not being able to produce a workable draft. By around this time, Joe Wizan, who had become the new head of Fox, put The Ninja and other projects that were given the greenlight into turnaround. This caused Zanuck and Brown to quit Fox and start working for Warner Brothers.

Santa Claus: The Movie
 In 1984, Carpenter was one of many directors attached to helm Santa Claus: The Movie, intending to cast Brian Dennehy or Wilford Brimley as the titular character. However, Carpenter hated the screenplay and pushed to write his own draft, additionally wanting to compose the film's musical score. The studio was uninterested in Carpenter doing anything besides directing and he eventually left the project over creative differences. Jeannot Szwarc would go on to direct the final project with David Huddleston playing Santa Claus.

Chickenhawk
 In the mid-80s, a film version of the novel was set to be written and directed by Carpenter but it was canceled by production studio New World Pictures.<ref>Prendergast, Mark The Redemption Of Robert Mason',' South Florida Sun-Sentinel June 23, 1985</ref>

Top Gun
 In 1985, Carpenter was offered a chance to direct Top Gun, but quickly turned it down. He did not see it being much of a success at all and thought that fighting the Soviet Union in the third act would not do any favors for already hostile international relations during the Cold War. Even in recent years, he has noted that there was nothing he could think of that he could have done with that movie; it just was not for him. Tony Scott was eventually chosen to direct the film.

The Golden Child
 In 1986, Carpenter was offered the chance to direct The Golden Child, but he preferred the similar script for Big Trouble in Little China, starring Kurt Russell; Michael Ritchie ended up directing the film. "The films have a similar theme in that they both explore Chinese legend and magic, but they develop in different ways," Carpenter said. "Golden Child is a very fine script. It has its problems, but it also has one big plus—Eddie Murphy. It will be hard to pull off that script. But if they do, it could be a wonderful movie!"

Armed and Dangerous
 In an August 1986 interview, John Candy revealed that Carpenter was initially attached to direct the film Armed and Dangerous, but was eventually replaced by Mark L. Lester.

Halloween 4: The Return of Michael Myers
 Cannon Films, who had just finished 1986's release of The Texas Chainsaw Massacre 2, approached Carpenter to write and direct Halloween 4: The Return of Michael Myers. Debra Hill planned to produce the film, while Carpenter teamed up with Dennis Etchison who, under the pseudonym Jack Martin, had written novelizations of both Halloween II (1981) and Halloween III: Season of the Witch (1982) to write a script to Halloween 4. Originally, Joe Dante was Carpenter's choice for director on the project itself. However, producer Moustapha Akkad rejected the Etchison script, calling it "too cerebral" and insisting that any new Halloween sequel must feature Michael Myers as a flesh and blood killer. In an interview, Etchison explained how he received the phone call informing him of the rejection of his script. Etchison said, "I received a call from Debra Hill and she said, 'Dennis, I just wanted you to know that John and I have sold our interest in the title 'Halloween' and unfortunately, your script was not part of the deal." Carpenter and Hill had signed all of their rights away to Akkad, who gained ownership. Akkad said, "I just went back to the basics of Halloween on Halloween 4 and it was the most successful." As Carpenter refused to continue his involvement with the series, a new director was sought out. Dwight H. Little, a native of Ohio, replaced Carpenter. Little had previously directed episodes for Freddy's Nightmares and the film Bloodstone.

Fatal Attraction
 Carpenter was offered a chance to direct the 1987 film Fatal Attraction, but he just was not interested in it at all. He has famously mentioned turning this down by saying that he read the script and basically told them that he had already seen this movie when it was called Play Misty for Me, thinking the movie was going to tank at the box office. Adrian Lyne ended up directing the film.

Shadow Company
 After finishing the 1988 film They Live, Carpenter was going to direct an action horror film called Shadow Company. Written by Shane Black (who was to produce it) and Fred Dekker, the project was to be executive produced by Walter Hill (who also co-wrote some of the script) with Kurt Russell in the main role. The script was about a group of US Special Forces soldiers who died during the Vietnam War. Years later, after their bodies are brought back, the soldiers, who were members of an Army project involving dark experiments, rise up from their graves, raid the armory from a nearby base, and attack the town in which they were buried, killing everyone during Christmas night. Due to problems in pre-production, the movie was never made, although the original 1988 script has gained a cult following from fans of Carpenter, Black and Dekker.

The Exorcist III
 In 1989, Carpenter was offered The Exorcist III, and met with writer William Peter Blatty (who also authored the novel on which it was based, Legion) during the course of a week. However, the two disagreed about the film's climax and Carpenter refused the project. Blatty directed the film himself a year later. Carpenter said that although they argued about the ending, they had a mutual respect and talked about an interest they shared: quantum physics.The Exorcist: Out of the Shadows (Omnibus Press, 1999)

Pincushion
 In 1989, Carpenter was going to direct Pincushion, a post-apocalyptic odyssey from rookie writer John Raffo (which producer Scott Rudin purchased during the writers' strike for $500,000). The film's relatively modest budget escalated towards $20 million, when Cher was cast in the lead role of the driver in post-plague America who must deliver a life-saving serum to save Salt Lake City. The film went undeveloped, leading to copies of the script being sold online.

1990s

Creature from the Black Lagoon
 In 1992, Carpenter was developing the remake of Creature from the Black Lagoon at Universal. He originally hired Bill Phillips to write the script while Rick Baker was hired to create the 3D model of the Creature, but the project never got green-lit. Recent development of another remake surfaced when Universal's Dark Universe was announced, but may have been shelved indefinitely due to the critical and financial failure of their first installment.

Tombstone
 In the early 1990s, Carpenter was going to direct the 1993 western film Tombstone. In the end, the film was directed by George P. Cosmatos and stars frequent Carpenter collaborator Kurt Russell.

Escape from Mars
 In 1996, the script to Ghosts of Mars originally started off as a potential Snake Plissken sequel. Entitled Escape from Mars, the story would have been largely much the same; however, after Escape from L.A. failed to make much money at the box office, the studio did not wish to make another Plissken movie. Snake Plissken was then changed to "Desolation Williams," and the studio also insisted that Ice Cube be given the part.

Godzilla
 At an early age, Carpenter created many horror short films with 8 mm film, including Gorgo Versus Godzilla due to his love of the 1954 classic Godzilla. Since becoming an influential director, he has always wanted to direct and write the first American Godzilla film. The 1998 and 2014 American films were released without Carpenter's involvement. In 2004, Carpenter appeared in an episode of Animal Planet's Animal Icons titled "It Came from Japan", where he discussed his love and admiration for the 1954 original Godzilla film.

Halloween H20: 20 Years Later
 Carpenter was originally in consideration to direct the Halloween (1978) sequel project, Halloween H20: 20 Years Later (1998) at the request of Jamie Lee Curtis who wanted to reunite the cast and crew of the original film. Carpenter agreed to direct the film, but his starting fee was $10 million. Carpenter claimed the hefty figure was compensation for revenue he had never received from the original Halloween, a matter that was still a point of contention between Carpenter and Halloween producer Moustapha Akkad. When Akkad balked at the requested salary, Carpenter quit the project. Steve Miner assumed directing of Halloween H20: 20 Years Later, which was a commercial success despite receiving mixed reviews.

2000s
Vampires (sequel)
 In early 2000, after enjoying his time while working on the 1998 film Vampires, John Carpenter showed interest in directing a sequel. Although the studio was interested and decided to move forward with a second film, Carpenter later declined after it was deemed unlikely that a sequel would be given a theatrical release. The film was made as Vampires: Los Muertos in 2002 with frequent Carpenter collaborator Tommy Lee Wallace taking over writer and director duties and Carpenter himself assuming the role of an executive producer.

Ghosts of Mars (sequel)
 Carpenter's 2001 film Ghosts of Mars was planned to be the first of a potential trilogy, as it ended on a cliffhanger with demons attacking the city. After the film bombed at the box office, plans for sequels were quickly scrapped.

The Thing (video game sequel)
 When the first game was released, Carpenter endorsed it and had a voice cameo as Dr. Sean Faraday. A sequel went into development after the first game proved a critical and commercial success, but it was cancelled when Computer Artworks went into receivership in October 2003. According to Diarmid Campbell, "we had the contract in place to make the sequel with Carpenter and were pretty excited about it. We had a very cool prototype of 'dynamic infection' and some really imaginative thing 'burst-outs'. I particularly liked the one where the person would split in half and their top half would jump to the ceiling and start swinging around like an orangutan with his intestines turned into tentacles." However, the project never developed beyond the proof of concept stage, with Computer Artworks producing some concept art, showing locations and enemies, and two short demo videos, but nothing else.

 Halloween-Hellraiser crossover 
 According to Doug Bradley and Clive Barker, John Carpenter was intended to direct a crossover film between the Halloween and Hellraiser series which Barker would have written and would have been released in 2004. However, the Akkad family and fans of both series disliked the idea, and it was abandoned.

The Thing (miniseries sequel)
 In 2005, the Syfy channel planned a four-hour miniseries sequel to The Thing, produced by Carpenter and Frank Darabont and written by David Leslie Johnson. The story follows a Soviet team who recover the corpses of MacReady and Childs, and remnants of the Thing. The story moves forward 23 years, where the Thing escapes in New Mexico, and follows the attempts at containment. The project never proceeded, and Universal opted to continue with a feature film prequel.

Psychopath (video game and film)
 In 2005, Titan Productions announced Psychopath, a first-person action video game, was being made in collaboration with Carpenter. Titan stated that the game would revolve around a former CIA operative who is forced back into duty to stop a serial killer. Titan's aim in the industry was to push projects through multiple forms of media. In conjunction with the game, a film version of Psychopath was in the works. Carpenter was to direct the film as well as the game's cutscenes and character design but neither the game or the film were ever released.

Zombieland (TV pilot)
 In 2006, Carpenter was one of the first to be attached to Zombieland, when it was still envisioned as a TV pilot. He had been tapped to helm the pilot, seemed excited to do it, then faded away from the project when it transitioned into becoming the feature film directed by Ruben Fleischer.

Planet Terror (music)
 In January 2007, Carpenter was going to write the music for the Robert Rodriguez film Planet Terror. In the end, he decided not to write it, with Rodriguez eventually taking over. Inspiration for his score came from Carpenter, whose music was often played on set.

The Haunting in Connecticut
 In early 2007, Gold Circle Films was reportedly discussing a directing contract with Carpenter for The Haunting in Connecticut. Although Carpenter was initially interested, the deal quickly fell through due to creative differences. Carpenter did enjoy the film's concept and would later agree to direct The Ward due to its similarities in tone and theme with The Haunting in Connecticut.

Darkchylde (film)
 In August 2007, Randy Queen, creator of the comic book character Darkchylde, revealed to Newsarama that a movie is in the works. In an interview with Nicholas Yanes from scifipulse.net, Queen was asked and responded to a question about a film/television adaptation of Darkchylde: "Yanes: For years now there have been rumors of Darkchylde being turned into an animated series, miniseries for a cable network and movie. Are you able to comment on Darkchylde's potential future on in television and film? Any actresses you'd love to play Ariel? Queen: A movie makes so much sense it's ridiculous, and all I can say is that we are working on it. I know that's a frustrating answer for fans, but it's a frustrating process. It's probably best for me not to comment on actresses, so we'll just all have to wait and see." Test footage from the set of Darkchylde emerged in July 2010 and on October 31, 2010, it was announced Carpenter was to direct.

Riot
 In November 2008, Carpenter was working on a project called Riot, written by Joe Gazzam. Originally titled Scared Straight!, based on the popular 1978 documentary, the prison thriller tells the story of a troubled youth who is sent to the Scared Straight crime-prevention program. But when a riot breaks out and the prisoners take him hostage, a lifer played by Nicolas Cage is forced to help the young man out.

2010s

F.E.A.R. 3
 In April 2010, Carpenter announced he will join the F.E.A.R. franchise, offering himself as a spokesman and to help direct the cinematics for F.E.A.R. 3. His only official credits on F.E.A.R. 3 were storyline consultant and narrator, showing no confirmation that he actually did direct the cinematics of the game.

They Live (remake)
 In Fall 2010, there was development on a remake of Carpenter's 1988 film They Live, with him in a producer role. In 2011, Matt Reeves signed on to direct and write the screenplay.

Dead Space (film)
 In 2013, Carpenter expressed interest in making a Dead Space film, due to his desire for a horror franchise movie that might surpass Resident Evil. Justin Marks would write the script, but adapting the game storyline and the characters made production easy. EA had plans to adapt the Dead Space videogames into a potential film franchise.

Sonic the Hedgehog (film)
 For many years during his career, Carpenter has been a known supporter of video games as a media and art form and has a particular liking for the Sonic the Hedgehog games, even teasing his interest in being involved in a feature film adaptation. When the 2020 Sonic the Hedgehog film cast and crew were hired, Carpenter was not listed, making his involvement on any Sonic project more unlikely.

 Untitled Big Trouble in Little China sequel
 In June 2015, The Wrap reported that Dwayne Johnson was developing a remake of Carpenter's 1986 film Big Trouble in Little China to star as Jack Burton and produce with his Seven Bucks Productions partners Dany and Hiram Garcia. Ashley Miller and Zack Stentz were to write the new script. In an interview with Entertainment Weekly, Johnson expressed interest in having Carpenter involved as a producer in the remake. Carpenter later said, "It's very early in the process. I haven't spoken to Dwayne Johnson about any of this... I'm ambivalent about a remake." On August 27, 2018, new development surfaced when they announced the film will be a sequel, instead of a remake, and Johnson will play an unknown main character, not Jack Burton.

Starman (remake)
 In April 2016, The Hollywood Reporter reported that Shawn Levy will direct and produce a remake of Carpenter's 1984 film Starman, with a script by Arash Amel. Michael Douglas, who was a producer of the original, is also on board to produce, while Carpenter, Dan Cohen, and Robert Mitas are executive producing, and Matt Milam and Adam North are overseeing the project for Columbia Pictures.

Nightside (TV series)
 On July 6, 2017, Carpenter announced that he was developing Simon R. Green novel Nightside into a television series for Universal Cable Productions.

Tales for a Halloween Night (TV series)
 On July 6, 2017, Carpenter announced that he was adapting his graphic novel Tales for a Halloween Night into a television series for the Syfy channel. On March 15, 2019, Sandy King announced that Tales for a Halloween Night'' has been scrapped. In August 2019, development on the series was revived by Paramount Television.

References

Lists of unrealized projects by artist
Unrealized projects